Shakhtar Luhansk was a Ukrainian football club from the city of Luhansk.

History
The football team was formed in 1977 when there was opened a new mine Luhanska No.1. At the team's beginning stood former players of FC Zorya Luhansk Volodymyr Abramov and Anatoliy Shulzhenko. The team competed in the Luhansk city championship hosting its games in a field next to the local Agricultural Institute.

In the early 1990s the team moved to the newly built stadium in the Luhansk's suburb Yuvileine. In 1993 out of Vahonobudivnyk Stakhanov was invited former Zorya goalkeeper Oleksandr Tkachenko who appointed the club's head coach (manager). Tkachenko became the first actual head coach of the club and the club fielded its senior team in oblast competitions.

As the club improved the club began taking part in the Ukrainian Amateur Competitions starting in 1999. In 2000 when the club was headed by Yuriy Pohrebnyak it brought along several better players and de facto uniting another local team Ellada-Enerhiya and Shakhtar. In 2001 the club won the Ukrainian Football Amateur League championship which earned them the right to enter the Professional leagues.

In the next season Shakhtar Luhansk entered the Druha Liha Group C and had a successful initial season finishing second. Unfortunately, prior to the start of the next season the club's administration withdrew the club from the PFL and the club subsequently dissolved.

Honors
Ukrainian Druha Liha: 
Runners Up: 1

 2002/03 Group C

Ukrainian Football Amateur Association: 1

 2001 Champions

League and cup history

{|class="wikitable"
|-bgcolor="#efefef"
! Season
! Div.
! Pos.
! Pl.
! W
! D
! L
! GS
! GA
! P
!Domestic Cup
!colspan=2|Europe
!Notes
|-
|align=center|2002–03
|align=center|3rd "C"
|align=center bgcolor=silver|2
|align=center|28
|align=center|25
|align=center|5
|align=center|3
|align=center|49
|align=center|15
|align=center|65
|align=center|1/32 finals
|align=center|
|align=center|
|align=center|
|-
|align=center|2003–04
|align=center colspan=13|Prior to the start of season the club folds
|}

Managers
 1993 – 1998 Oleksandr Tkachenko
 1998 – 1999 Yuriy Kolesnikov
 2000 – 2000 Viktor Kuznetsov
 2001 – 2001 Anatoliy Shakun
 2001 – 2002 Yuriy Pohrebnyak
 2002 – 2002 Vladimir Kuzovlyov
 2002 – 2003 Yuriy Pohrebnyak

References

External links
 Official website (no longer active, archived)
 Shakhtar Luhansk at footballfacts.ru

 
Football clubs in Luhansk
Defunct football clubs in Ukraine
Association football clubs established in 1977
Association football clubs disestablished in 2003
1977 establishments in Ukraine
2003 disestablishments in Ukraine
Mining association football teams in Ukraine